The Sierra de Francia is a comarca located at the southern end of Salamanca Province, Castile and León, Spain. It is located about 70 km from Salamanca city. It borders with the Las Hurdes and Las Batuecas comarcas of Extremadura to the south; the Campo Charro to the north and the Sierra de Béjar to the east. The region is sparsely inhabited and its few towns have great cultural value.

Geography 
The mountain range Sierra de Francia  belongs to the Sistema Central. Its slopes are covered with forests of alder, oak, pine and ash. They rise over the Northern Castilian Plateau and mark the geographical limit of its southwestern plains (Llanura Salmantina). From its southern side this mountain chain marks the northern limit of Las Hurdes, the legendary Extremaduran comarca. The mountain range consists of a quite regular succession of peaks of moderate height, of which the Pico de La Hastiala (1.735 m) is the highest. At the top of the Peña de Francia (1723 m) stands one of the highest Virgin Mary shrines of the world, as well as a RTVE antenna. Other summits worth mentioning are the Mesa del Francés (1.638 m) and the Pico Robledo (1.614 m). All these peaks are usually covered with snow in the winter season.

Among the rivers that cut valleys in the sierra, the most famous is the Río Francia, which gives the mountain chain its name, as well as the Alagón.

Natural park and biosphere
Most of Sierra de Francia's territory, together with the valley of Las Batuecas was declared Las Batuecas-Sierra de Francia Natural Park in 1978.
Together with the neighboring Sierra de Béjar (comarca) it constitutes a Biosphere Reserve. Some of the towns of the comarca have been officially declared Conjunto Histórico-Artístico owing to their cultural and architectural value.

Municipalities
Sierra de Francia contains the following 26 municipalities:

 Aldeanueva de la Sierra
 Cepeda
 Cereceda de la Sierra
 Cilleros de la Bastida
 El Cabaco
 El Maíllo
 El Tornadizo
 Escurial de la Sierra
 Garcibuey
 Herguijuela de la Sierra
 La Alberca (capital of the comarca and declared Conjunto Histórico-Artístico)
 La Bastida
 La Rinconada de la Sierra
 Las Casas del Conde
 Linares de Riofrío
 Madroñal
 Miranda del Castañar (Conjunto Histórico-Artístico)
 Mogarraz (Conjunto Histórico-Artístico)
 Molinillo
 Monforte de la Sierra
 Nava de Francia
 Navarredonda de la Rinconada
 Pinedas
 San Esteban de la Sierra
 San Martín del Castañar (Conjunto Histórico-Artístico)
 San Miguel de Valero
 San Miguel del Robledo
 Santibáñez de la Sierra
 Sequeros (Conjunto Histórico-Artístico)
 Sotoserrano
 Valero
 Villanueva del Conde (Conjunto Histórico-Artístico)

References

External links 
 Diputación de Salamanca - Turismo - Sierra de Francia.
 Web de Turismo de la Junta de Castilla y León.
 Patrimonio Natural de Castilla y León

Geography of the Province of Salamanca
Comarcas of the Province of Salamanca